Iowane Divavesi is a professional rugby league footballer who plays for the Terrigal Sharks He also plays for Fiji.

He was a member of the Fiji squad for the 2008 Rugby League World Cup. However, he missed the final two games of the tournament due to suspension.

References

Fijian rugby league players
Fiji national rugby league team players
Living people
1980 births
Rugby league props
I-Taukei Fijian people